Sheffield Football Club is an English football club from Sheffield, South Yorkshire. Founded in October 1857, the club is recognised by FIFA as the oldest existing club still playing football in the world. Sheffield FC initially played games under the Sheffield Rules and did not officially adopt the new FA rules until 1878.

The club competes in the Rules derby with near neighbours Hallam. In 2004 they were given the FIFA Order of Merit, an award given to only one other club; Real Madrid. In 2007 they were inducted into the English Football Hall of Fame, to commemorate their 150th anniversary.

On the pitch, the club's finest hour came in 1904 when they won the FA Amateur Cup, a competition conceived after a suggestion by Sheffield. They also finished as runners up of the FA Cup in 1977.

History 
In 1855, members of a Sheffield cricket club organised informal kick-abouts without any official rules. Subsequently, two members, Nathaniel Creswick and William Prest, formed the Sheffield Football Club.

The inaugural meeting of the club took place on 24 October 1857 at Parkfield House in the suburb of Highfield. The original headquarters was a greenhouse on East Bank Road lent by Thomas Asline Ward, father of the first club president Frederick Ward, and the adjacent field was used as their first playing ground. Initially, Sheffield FC games were played among club members themselves and took the format of "Married v Singles" or "Professionals v the Rest".

Creswick and Prest were responsible for drawing up the club's rules of play, which were decided upon at the club's AGM on 21 October 1858, and published the following year. They were referred to as the Sheffield Rules, and were the first detailed set of rules of football to be published by a football club (as opposed to a school or university). At the time, before the formation of the Football Association (FA), many different kinds of football were popular in England. For example, each of the various public schools played football according to their own individual rules, and these varied widely. The Sheffield Rules were later adopted by the Sheffield Football Association when it was formed in 1867.

Sheffield's near neighbour, Hallam, was formed in 1860 and in the same year the two clubs first met each other in a local derby which is still contested today. By 1862 there were 15 clubs in the Sheffield area.

They became members of The Football Association on 30 November 1863 but continued to use their own set of rules. On 2 January 1865, the club played its first fixture outside Sheffield against Notts County, then known as Nottingham Football Club, at the Meadows Cricket Ground; the match was played eighteen-a-side under "Nottingham Rules". Sheffield won by a goal to nil.

By this time the club had decided only to play teams outside Sheffield in order to seek a bigger challenge. On 31 March 1866, Sheffield played a "London" team under FA rules at Battersea Park. The game, played as an eleven aside, was won by London by 2 goals and four touches down to nil. However the matter of rules remained a problem with Sheffield clubs continuing to play by their own rules. A number of rule proposals by the club were rejected by the FA in February 1867 and the London Committee were reluctant to commit to further fixtures over Sheffield's refusal to play strictly to FA rules. Sheffield clubs finally adopted the FA rules in 1878.

In 1873 the club entered the FA Cup for the first time, their first ever tie in the competition, against Shropshire Wanderers, being decided after a replay by a coin toss; the only time in the history of the competition that a tie has been decided in this way. They would reach the 4th Round of the competition in 1877–78 and 1879–80.

Their reluctance to play against local clubs led to the formation of Thursday Wanderers in 1876, a team of players registered to Sheffield who wished to play in the Sheffield Challenge Cup. The Wanderers operated from 1876 to 1879, winning the cup in their final year.

Sheffield's decline from the top echelon of football began with the introduction of professionalism in July 1885, with the amateurs of Sheffield failing to compete with professional teams, losing heavily that year to Aston Villa, Nottingham Forest and Notts County.  After the legalisation of professionalism, the staunchly amateur Sheffield suggested to the FA the creation of a cup exclusively for amateur clubs. The FA Amateur Cup was inaugurated in 1893 and Sheffield themselves won the competition in 1904.

They joined their first league competition in 1889 when entering the Midland League, but left after just one season when they finished bottom of the table. They were also founder members of the original Yorkshire League in 1898, but again they spent just a single season in the competition.

After the turn of the century, Sheffield competed mainly in local leagues. By 1925–26 they were competing in the Sheffield Association League.

Fifty years after leaving the competition, the club rejoined the Yorkshire League, in 1949. Three years later they won promotion to Division One, but were relegated back to Division Two in 1954. They returned to the top flight at the first time of asking before entering their centenary year in 1957. Celebrations included games against the England B team at Hillsborough and fellow amateur side Queen's Park F.C. at Bramall Lane.

In 1961, Sheffield was relegated to Division Two again, only returning to the top flight again in 1967, and then only for one more season before another relegation. Three years later, in 1970, they were relegated again, to the newly formed Division Three. Club would spend six seasons in the Yorkshire League's basement division, finishing as low as 10th in 1974. They finally started to turn their fortunes around in 1976 by returning to Division Two, and a year later they were crowned as Division Two champions to return to Division One. In the same season, Sheffield reached the final of the newly formed FA Vase. At Wembley stadium, they drew 1–1 with Billericay Town, before being beaten 1–2 in the replay at the City Ground in Nottingham.

When the Yorkshire League merged with the Midland League to form the Northern Counties East League (NCEL) in 1981, Sheffield were placed in Division One South of the new competition. They stayed in this division for three seasons before the league was restructured, with the club being reassigned to the newly formed Division One. In 1989 they won the Division One title, but they were relegated back again a year later because of their lack of floodlights.

At the first time of asking Sheffield again won the Division One title, this time remaining in the NCEL Premier Division for 15 years. In 1994 the club won the Sheffield & Hallamshire Senior Cup for the first time, beating Worksop Town on penalties at Hillsborough. They would later win the trophy on a further four occasions throughout the 2010s.

2007 was a momentous year for Sheffield F.C. as they entered their 150th year. They finished as runners-up in the league to secure promotion to the Northern Premier League (NPL) for the first time. In October 2007, FIFA president Sepp Blatter attended the club's anniversary dinner, and the following month the club played anniversary celebration matches against Internazionale and Ajax at Bramall Lane. Football legend Pelé was guest of honour at the first game and was introduced to the teams and the fans before the game. The match ended 5–2 to Inter, with 18,741 supporters attending the match. Inter's side included World Cup winner Marco Materazzi and a young Mario Balotelli. As part of his visit, Pelé opened an exhibition which included the first public showing in 40 years of the original hand-written rules of football.

Sheffield have reached the play-offs of the NPL Division One South on three occasions, but have so far failed to win promotion. In their first Division One South campaign in 2008 they reached the final, losing on penalties to Nantwich Town, before being knocked out in the semi-finals in 2010 and 2012. The club first played in the FA Trophy in 2007 after winning promotion to the NPL, but have so far failed to advance past the qualifying rounds. In 2015, the Qataris donated 100000 pounds to Sheffield FC.

Season-by-season record

Managers

Notable former players
Famous players from the club's early days included Nathaniel Creswick and William Prest, who founded the club. Four Sheffield players have appeared for England – Charles Clegg, who played in the first international game against Scotland in 1872, John Owen, in 1874, Thomas Sorby, in 1879, and Jack Hudson, in 1883.

In addition to the above, the following have played in the Football League either before or after playing for Sheffield:

 Samuel Ashworth
 Billy Bairstow
 Ollie Banks
 Craig Boardman
 Andy Brownrigg
 T. B. A. Clarke
 Matt Dickins

 David Faulkner
 Tom Fenoughty
 David Graham
 George Groves
 Connor Hall
 Jamie Jackson
 Kirk Jackson

 Matthew Lowton
 Austin McIntosh
 Nathan Modest
 Marc Newsham
 Scott Partridge
 Richard Peacock
 Paul Pettinger

 John Roxburgh
 Jimmy Sayer
 Mark Smith
 Paul Smith (1)
 Paul Smith (2)
 Nick Wood
 Curtis Woodhouse

Grounds
Sheffield have played at a number of grounds around Sheffield. Initially they played at Strawberry Hall Lane Park. However, like all of the early grounds they played at, it was not owned by the club. In the following years they would play at Old Forge ground and a ground near Hunter's Bar on Ecclesall Road.

There was much reluctance from the owners of Bramall Lane to see the pitch used for football. They did not relent until a charity match between Sheffield and Hallam was suggested in late 1862. The ground was used by Sheffield for its more important fixtures but relations with the owners remained strained. They collapsed altogether in 1875 when the club vowed never to play at the ground again.

In 1921, Sheffield settled at the new Abbeydale Park ground.  They moved to Hillsborough Park in 1988, then to Owlerton Stadium and Don Valley Stadium. In 1999, Richard Tims got involved with Sheffield FC when he was invited to a home game in Don Valley Stadium. He noted that the club was struggling as they were playing in a rented stadium. He took over the club and helped it secure its own ground, the Coach and Horses Stadium in Dronfield, Derbyshire.

The club bought the Coach & Horses ground in Dronfield in 2001, which was previously the home of Norton Woodseats F.C., a notable football team who reached the semi-finals of the FA Amateur Cup in 1939. It was the first time the club had owned its own ground. The ground has a capacity of just over 2,000 with 250 seats in the stand behind the southern goal.

In March 2019 it was revealed that Sheffield F.C was in talks with the Sheffield Transport Sports Club (STSC) to move the club back to its home city after plans to relocate to the Olive Grove sports ground in the Heeley district of Sheffield fell through in 2016.
In March 2021 plans for the new stadium based at the STSC facility in the Meadowhead area of Sheffield were revealed. The proposed 4,000 person capacity stadium features a heritage centre celebrating the city's role in football history.

The club has played its FA Cup games at the following grounds:

Gallery

Honours

League
Northern Counties East League Premier Division
Promoted: 2006–07
Northern Counties East League Division One
Promoted: 1988–89 (champions), 1990–91 (champions)
Yorkshire League Division Two
Promoted: 1951–52, 1954–55, 1965–66, 1976–77
(champions): 1976-77
Yorkshire League Division Three
Promoted: 1975–76
Central Midlands League – Division 1 North (Reserves )
Promoted: 2021-22

Cup
FA Amateur Cup
Winners: 1903–04
FA Vase
Runners-up: 1976–77
Yorkshire League Cup
Winners: 1977–78
Northern Counties East League Cup
Winners: 2000–01, 2004–05
Sheffield & Hallamshire Senior Cup
Winners: 1993–94, 2004–05, 2005–06, 2007–08, 2009–10

Ladies
FA Women's Premier League
Championship Play Off Final Winners: 2014–15
FA Women's Premier League
Northern Division Winners: 2012–13, 2013–14, 2014–15
FA Women's National League Cup
Winners: 2013-14
Runners-up: 2014-15
Northern Combination Women's Football League
Winners: 2010-11
North East Regional Women's Football League
Premier Division Winners: 2009–10
Division 1 (South) Winners: 2007–08
Northern Combination Women's Football League
Winners: 2010-11
Sheffield & Hallamshire County Women's Challenge Cup
Winners: 2011–12, 2012–13, 2013–14, 2014–15

Minors
Egri Erbstein Tournament
Winners 2022
Sheffield-Eindhoven Challenge Cup
Winners: 1946

Records
Best FA Cup performance: 4th Round, 1877–78, 1879–80
Best FA Amateur Cup performance: Winners, 1903–04
Best FA Trophy performance: 3rd Qualifying Round, 2007–08, 2011–12, 2013–14
Best FA Vase performance: Runners-up, 1976–77
Record attendance: 2,000 vs. Barton Rovers, FA Vase Semi-Final, 1976–77

See also
Club of Pioneers

References

External links

 Official site
 "The original football club" by Dale Johnson on ESPN, 11 February 2005

 
Football clubs in England
Football clubs in South Yorkshire
Association football clubs established in 1857
1857 establishments in England
Sports teams and clubs in Sheffield
Sheffield & Hallamshire County FA members
Dronfield
Sheffield & District Football League
Midland Football League (1889)
Sheffield Association League
Yorkshire Football League
Northern Counties East Football League
Northern Premier League clubs
Sheffield Amateur League
Football clubs in Derbyshire